Steam Powered Giraffe is an American musical project formed in San Diego in 2008, self-described as "a musical act that combines robot pantomime, puppetry, ballet, comedy, projections, and music". Created and led by twins David Michael Bennett and Isabella Bunny Bennett, the act combines music and improvisational comedy on-stage, although their studio works focus almost solely on music.

Steam Powered Giraffe has its own fictional mythology influenced by the steam punk subculture, with the band members portraying characters both on stage and on record; its fictional universe has been explored via several comic books mainly written and drawn by Isabella Bennett. Although the band underwent several line-up changes, it always focuses primarily on three robot characters (played by the Bennett siblings and a third performer, although the original line-up featured four robots), with several "humans" assisting and performing comedy, music and dancing on stage, and several smaller robots being performed via puppetry or voice acting. To date, they have released six studio albums, two live albums, several live concert films, provided the soundtrack for the 2015 video game SteamWorld Heist, and released an official single for the 2016 video game Battleborn.

Career

2008–2011: Formation and early career 

The members of Steam Powered Giraffe met while taking Theatre Arts at Grossmont College in El Cajon, California. Afterwards, they became members of a local San Diego pantomime group called Troupe SD. Trained in pantomime by Seaport Village mime Jerry "Kazoo" Hager, and with collective backgrounds in clown, theater, music, and visual design, Jonathan Sprague, Erin Burke, and the Bennett twins—Isabella and David—started street busking as quirky robotic characters in January 2008 at Balboa Park, California. For their first performance in public they called themselves Steam Powered Giraffe Presents: Peoplebots. Later that month they changed their name to just Steam Powered Giraffe. Erin Burke left the group in 2011 to pursue a career in acting.

Since their conception, the band has performed at venues including the San Diego County Fair, San Diego Zoo, Wild Animal Park, Legoland California, Ontario Mills, Downtown Disney, and numerous science fiction, fantasy, anime, and steampunk conventions.

In October 2009, the band released their first album, Album One. It contained the previously released single from May 2009 titled "On Top of the Universe", in 2009. In early 2011 the band released a single, "Honeybee", announcing that it would be on an upcoming second album. In late 2011 the band announced the release of a "live" album entitled Live at the Globe of Yesterday's Tomorrow.

2012–2013: The 2¢ Show and MK III 
Their second studio album, entitled The 2¢ Show, was released in May 2012. That year, they were voted Best Live Comedy act (and runner up for Best Family Entertainment act) on San Diego A-List.

Besides their musical endeavors, the band publishes a web comic and has produced a card game based on characters in their backstory. In April 2012 they released a DVD entitled, Steam Powered Giraffe: The DVD (and the Quest For the Eternal Harp of Golden Dreams).

On 24 September 2012, the band announced on their Tumblr page that Jon Sprague would no longer be a part of the group. On 1 October it was announced that Sam Luke, then the group's drummer, would become the new robot in the band, "Hatchworth". On 2 November 2012, Hatchworth made his stage debut with the group at Youmacon in Detroit, Michigan, with Mike Buxbaum of A City Serene filling in on drums. Matt Smith was later named as the group's new official drummer.

During this time, SPG also introduced the characters of the Walter Girls into their shows. The Girls started out manning the band's merchandise tables at shows, but were gradually integrated into the group's stage show and backstory. Described as "blue matter engineers", the porcelain-white skinned and blue-haired Walter Girls (now called Walter Workers) are essentially the robot's caretakers on stage.

In June 2013, SPG released a cover of Rihanna's "Diamonds", essentially a solo performance by the Spine. The accompanying video, released to YouTube, introduced a new character to the SPG canon, a robotic giraffe puppet named GG (voiced by Bunny Bennett). GG appeared again in July when the band released a comedic video, "Walter Robotics Rap", to YouTube.

On 9 August 2013, Steam Powered Giraffe announced the title to their third album, MK III. The album was released on December 3. In September of that same year, the band released a cover of Icona Pop's "I Love It" on their YouTube channel. On 27 August 2013, the band was voted Best Family Entertainment and Best Local Band by the San Diego A-List.

2014–2016: The Vice Quadrant and Quintessential 
On March 18, 2014, it was announced that Michael Reed and Matt Smith would no longer be performing members of Steam Powered Giraffe. The Bennett twins stated that the reasons for their departure was to focus more on the theatrical elements of the act and to reduce the cost of touring, but they have also stated in recent years on their podcast The Bennettarium that Michael Reed had neglected his contracted work on their MK III album, with him having to cram in all his work the last few weeks of production.

Early in 2014, Isabella Bennett began to transition the character of Rabbit from male to female, coinciding with her own status as a transgender woman.  She legally changed her name to Isabella Bennett on 22 January 2016.

More videos have followed in the meantime. In May 2014, they released their third cover, a mostly acoustic version of Daft Punk's "Harder, Better, Faster, Stronger". The video marked the first "official" appearance by the female Rabbit to the general public at large (although the band had played some dates prior and some photos and raw audience footage had been seen). The band then followed up with two new videos: "Fancy Shoes" in June and "I'll Rust With You" in July, with the latter featuring live footage recorded at Anime Midwest in Rosemont, Illinois.

In September 2014, Steam Powered Giraffe gave their first international performance, playing at the Grand Canadian Steampunk Exposition in Niagara-on-the-Lake, Ontario. They returned for the 2015 Exposition to do a collaboration show with Professor Elemental.

On September 1, 2015, SPG released The Vice Quadrant: A Space Opera, a two-disc space opera concept album containing 28 tracks, although iTunes released it as two separate albums for download. The release followed a number of video releases to promote the work. This marked the band's first recorded work with Rabbit presenting as a woman, as well as the first full album recorded strictly as a trio. The album featured an appearance by Professor Elemental as well as vocals by Walter Worker Chelsea Penyak.

In December 2015, video game developer Image & Form released the game SteamWorld Heist for the Nintendo 3DS, and later released it in 2016 on other platforms. The game's soundtrack was composed and recorded by SPG, and they appear in-game.

The video game Battleborn by Gearbox Software released on May 3, 2016, and included an unlockable theme song created by Steam Powered Giraffe for the character of Montana; the same day, the band released it on digital platforms as a single.

On June 20, 2016, Steam Powered Giraffe announced on their website that their fifth studio album, Quintessential was available for pre-order. According to the announcement, a free downloadable digital copy of the twelve-track album would be included with the purchase of the CD.

2016–2019: New member 
On December 19, 2016, the band announced on social media that Samuel Luke would be leaving the group to focus on his independent work as an artist and musician. He then announced that he would immediately be replaced by Bryan Barbarin and his character Zer0. The next day, the Bennetts, Luke, and Barbarin appeared on David and Isabella's new podcast, The Bennettarium, to discuss the robot transition, among other things. Zer0's first live show occurred on February 18, 2017, at The Center Theater at The California Center for the Arts in Escondido, California.

It was confirmed on March 12, 2017, following her appearance on The Bennettarium, that the 2009 original release of the band's Album One album, featuring a song and some vocals by past band member Erin Burke, would be re-released. Both the 2009 and 2011 version now co-exist.

On July 20, 2017 the band performed a show during San Diego Comic Con with former member Michael Philip Reed joining them on stage. Reed subsequently joined the band for most shows up until February 2020.

On January 27, 2018 Steam Powered Giraffe celebrated the band's 10th anniversary with a special concert featuring all members in the band's history, including all five former members: robots The Jon, Upgrade and Hatchworth, and humans Michael Philip Reed and Matthew Smith. It was later released as a live concert film on Blu-Ray, DVD, and digital video.

On April 18, 2019, the band announced the production of their next album, the first to feature Barbarin and the first since MK III to feature Michael Philip Reed. They also confirmed that they would be releasing two new songs every three to four months alongside music videos for each song.

2020–present: 1896 
On March 3, 2020, the band announced that Reed was leaving the band to move out of the country.  Reed had provided some contributions to tracks on the band's 6th album 1896 prior to his departure. On July 10, 2020, the band posted on social media that due to inappropriate interactions with fans coming to light after his departure, they would no longer be working with Reed or the band's live show sound technician Steve Negrete.

On November 9, 2020 the band released their newest album 1896, a two-disc album featuring 22 songs, ten of which are acoustic versions of other songs on the album.

Band members

Current line-up 
 Robots
 The Spine (David Michael Bennett) is a futuristic dieselpunk robot with a silver face. He is the "straight man" in a lot of the band's comedic skits on stage.
– lead and backing vocals, guitars, bass, mandolin, keyboards, recording engineer, producer (2008–present)
 Rabbit (Isabella Bunny Bennett) is a clockwork robot with a copper and white porcelain face. Her makeup, costume, and hair change frequently. Bunny also performs the character of G.G. The Giraffe via puppetry and voice acting.
– lead and backing vocals, accordion, keytar, megaphone, melodica, tambourine (2008–present)
 Zer0 (Bryan Barbarin) is a swing-styled robot with a gold and silver colored face. According to his lore, the robot was hastily put together from left-over scrap robot parts in 1896, but was forgotten deep in the Walter family's workshop until he was re-discovered in 1992.
– lead and backing vocals, bass (2016–present)

 Humans
 Walter Worker Chelsea (Chelsea Penyak) and Walter Worker Camille (Camille Penyak) – on-stage characters, on-stage ballet accompaniment, and workers for live show merchandise booths (2014–present)

Past members 
Robots
Upgrade (Erin Burke) was a robot with a pink-colored face and part of the original four members. She left the band in 2011.
– vocals, tambourine (2008–2011; guest: 2018)
 The Jon (Jonathan Sprague) was a gold art deco robot and part of the original four members. He left the band in 2012.
– lead and backing vocals, guitar, mandolin, bass, drums (2008–2012; guest: 2018)
 Hatchworth (Sam Luke) was a copper art deco robot who was previously a drummer for the band, as a human, before replacing The Jon as a robot. He left the band in 2016.
– lead and backing vocals, bass, guitars (live show drummer: 2010–2012; robot performer: 2012–2016; guest: 2018)

 Humans
 Matthew Smith – drums, backing vocals (2012–2014: guest: 2018)
 Michael Philip Reed – multi-instrumentalist, lead and backing vocals (2009–2014, 2017–2020)
 Brianna Clawson – Walter Worker character, merchandise (2012–2013)
 Paige Law – Walter Worker character, merchandise (2012–2014)
 Carolina Gumbayan – Walter Worker character, merchandise, bass (2013–2014)
 Steve Negrete – live show audio engineering, also performed the characters of Beebop and Qwerty via voice acting on projection screen (2009–2020)

Discography

Studio albums 
 Album One (2009) (re-released in 2011) 
 The 2¢ Show (2012)
 MK III (2013)
 The Vice Quadrant: A Space Opera (2015)
 Quintessential (2016)
 1896 (2020)
 The Seventh (upcoming)

Live albums 
 Live at the Globe of Yesterday's Tomorrow (2011)
 Live at the Walter Robotics Expo 2013 (2014)

Concert films 
The Quest for the Eternal Harp of Golden Dreams (2012)
Live at Walter Robotics Expo 2013 (2014)
Concierto Privado (2016)
10 Year Anniversary Show (2018)
Live in Denver Colorado (2018)
Live in La Jolla California (2019)

Soundtrack albums 
 Music From SteamWorld Heist (2015)

Singles 
 "On Top of the Universe" (2009)
 "Honeybee" (2011)
 "Montana" (2016), in collaboration with 2016 video game Battleborn
 "Shattered Stars" (2019)
 "Latum Alterum (Ya Ya Ya)" (2019)
"Hot on the Trail" (2019)
"Transform" (2019)
"Lyin' Awake" (2020)
"Eat Your Heart" (2020)
"Intertwined" (2020)
"Bad Days on the Horizon" (2020)
"Olly and the Equinox Band" (2020)
"Fart Patrol" (2021)
"Twinkle Twinkle Little Star" (2021)

Covers 
 "Diamonds" (Rihanna cover, 2013)
 "I Love It" (Icona Pop cover, 2013)
 "Harder, Better, Faster, Stronger" (Daft Punk cover, 2014)
 "Cellophane" (Sia cover, 2015)
 "A Marshmallow World" (Bing Crosby cover, 2016)
 "Summertime Sadness" (Lana Del Rey cover, 2021)
 "Harmony" (Elton John cover, 2022)
 "Un-Break My Heart" (Toni Braxton cover, 2022)

See also 
 List of steampunk musicians

Notes

References

External links 
 

Bands with fictional stage personas
Musical groups established in 2008
Musical groups from San Diego
Songwriters from California
Steampunk music
LGBT-themed musical groups
Sibling musical groups
2008 establishments in California